Starling Javier Marte (born October 9, 1988) is a Dominican professional baseball outfielder for the New York Mets of Major League Baseball (MLB). He previously played in MLB for the Pittsburgh Pirates, Arizona Diamondbacks, Miami Marlins, and Oakland Athletics. He made his MLB debut in 2012 with the Pirates. Marte is a two-time MLB All-Star and a two-time Gold Glove Award winner. In 2021, he led the major leagues with 47 stolen bases.

Early life
Marte grew up on the outskirts of Santo Domingo, the capital of the Dominican Republic. After his mother's death when he was nine, his grandmother took care of him.

Career

Minor leagues (2007–2012)
He signed with the Pittsburgh Pirates in 2007, and was primarily a center fielder during his time in the minors. In 2010, Marte played 60 games for the Pirates' Class A affiliate, the Bradenton Marauders, ending with a batting average of .315. He hit 16 doubles and five triples that season while also stealing 22 bases. Marte represented the Pittsburgh Pirates at the 2011 All-Star Futures Game. In 2011, while playing for the Altoona Curve, Marte was an Eastern League Mid-Season All-Star and Post-Season All-Star, a Baseball America Double-A All-Star, a Topps Double-A All-Star, and a Milb.com organization All-Star. On August 15, 2011, Marte was named the EL's player of the week. Marte also won the Eastern League Batting Title with a .332 batting average and was named the Eastern League Rookie of the Year. Marte was added to the Pirates 40-man roster on November 18, 2011.

Marte was ranked number 73 on Baseball America's Top 100 Prospects list in February 2012 and number 56 on Baseball Prospectus's Top 101 Prospect list in February 2012. In 2012, while playing for the Indianapolis Indians, Marte was named an International League Mid-Season All-Star. On July 2, 2012, Marte was named the International League player of the week.

Pittsburgh Pirates (2012–2019)

On July 26, 2012, the Pirates promoted Marte from Indianapolis Indians, becoming the first graduate of the Pirates' Latin American complex, located in the Dominican Republic, to reach the major leagues. He hit a home run on the first pitch he faced in his major league career, off Houston Astros pitcher Dallas Keuchel. The hit made Marte the third player in Pirates' franchise history to homer in his first at-bat and the first to do it since Don Leppert in 1961. He also became the first Pirate to homer on the first pitch of his major league career since Walter Mueller did so in 1922.

Marte and the Pirates finalized a 6-year, $31 million deal on March 28, 2014. On August 18, 2014, Marte had his second career multi-homer game in a 7–3 loss to the Atlanta Braves. He won his first career Rawlings Gold Glove Award in 2015.

On April 18, 2017, Marte was suspended 80 games without pay due to use of Nandrolone, a type of performance-enhancing drug that violates the MLB's drug agreement. He was also deemed ineligible to play in post-season competition, though the Pirates failed to qualify. Marte issued a statement afterwards, reading: "I have been informed that I have tested positive in one of the tests that are regularly done in my job. In this very difficult moment I apologize to my family, my fans and baseball in general. Neglect and lack of knowledge have led me to this mistake with the high price to pay of being away from the field that I enjoy and love so much. With much embarrassment and helplessness, I ask for forgiveness for unintentionally disrespecting so many people who have trusted in my work and have supported me so much. I promise to learn the lesson that this ordeal has left me. God bless you."

He was activated on July 18, 2017. In 2017, he batted .275 with 21 stolen bases.

In 2018, Marte batted .277 with 33 stolen bases.  He and Jean Segura were the only two MLB players to have stolen 20 or more bases each season since 2013.

On defense in 2019, he had a -11 Defensive Runs Saved (DRS) rating, the lowest in the major leagues among center fielders. However, on offense, he hit .295 and set career highs with 23 home runs and 82 runs batted in.

Arizona Diamondbacks (2020)
On January 27, 2020, the Pirates traded Marte and cash considerations to the Arizona Diamondbacks in exchange for infielder Liover Peguero, pitcher Brennan Malone, and international bonus pool signing money.

Miami Marlins (2020–2021) 
On August 31, 2020, the Diamondbacks traded Marte to the Miami Marlins for Caleb Smith, Humberto Mejía and Julio Frias. Between the Diamondbacks and Marlins, Marte slashed .281/.340/.430 with 6 home runs, 27 RBI, and 10 stolen bases in 61 games during the shortened 60-game season.

Marte was placed on the injured list on April 20, 2021 with a fractured rib. A month later he would enter his rehab assignment with the Jacksonville Jumbo Shrimp and return to the Marlins on May 28. Marte was named NL Player of the Week for June 7 - June 13, the first Marlins player since 2017. In seven games that week he batted .500 (14 for 28), two home runs, one double, five RBIs, and a 1.298 OPS. He also stole four bases without being caught.

On July 18, Marte rejected a $30 million extension offer from the Marlins.

Oakland Athletics (2021) 
On July 28, 2021, the Marlins traded Marte along with cash considerations to the Oakland Athletics in exchange for Jesús Luzardo. In 56 games, Marte batted .312/.355/.462 with 25 stolen bases for Oakland in 2021. Between Miami and Oakland, Marte stole an MLB-leading 47 bases in 2021.

New York Mets

On November 30, 2021, Marte signed a four-year contract with the New York Mets worth $78 million.

Personal life
Marte has three children, sons Starling Jr. and Smerling and daughter Tiana, with his late wife, Noelia Brazoban. In May 2020, Brazoban suffered a heart attack and died while in the hospital awaiting surgery on a broken ankle.

Marte's grandmother, who raised him from the age of 9, died in May 2022, almost two years to the day after the passing of his wife. Upon his return to the Mets after being placed on the bereavement list, Marte hit a home run on the first pitch he faced from Colorado Rockies starter Germán Márquez, dedicating his hit to his "loved ones up in heaven."

See also

List of Pittsburgh Pirates home run leaders
List of Major League Baseball players suspended for performance-enhancing drugs
List of Major League Baseball players with a home run in their first major league at bat

References

External links

1988 births
Living people
Águilas Cibaeñas players
Altoona Curve players
Arizona Diamondbacks players
Bradenton Marauders players
Dominican Republic expatriate baseball players in the United States
Dominican Republic sportspeople in doping cases
Dominican Summer League Pirates players
Gold Glove Award winners
Gulf Coast Pirates players
Indianapolis Indians players
Jacksonville Jumbo Shrimp players
Leones del Escogido players
Lynchburg Hillcats players
Major League Baseball center fielders
Major League Baseball left fielders
Major League Baseball players from the Dominican Republic
Major League Baseball players suspended for drug offenses
Miami Marlins players
National League All-Stars
New York Mets players
Oakland Athletics players
Pittsburgh Pirates players
Sportspeople from Santo Domingo
State College Spikes players
West Virginia Power players
World Baseball Classic players of the Dominican Republic
2017 World Baseball Classic players